Creamy snuff is a snuff paste consisting of tobacco, clove oil, glycerin, spearmint, menthol, and camphor, and sold in a toothpaste tube. According to the U.S NIH-sponsored Smokeless Tobacco Fact Sheet,  the manufacturer recommends letting the paste linger in your mouth before rinsing." It is packaged in tubes similar to those used for toothpaste. The product is addictive. A similar product, known as gul or gadakhu, is made with dried rose petals soaked in sugar syrup and fermented and used mainly in India as a mouth freshener.

See also 
 Chewing tobacco
 Snus

References

Dentifrices
Tobacco products
Tobacco in India